Novomoskovsk is a city and the administrative center of Novomoskovsky District in Tula Oblast, Russia, located at the source of the Don and Shat Rivers. Population:    143,000 (1974); 107,000 (1959); 76,000 (1939).

History

The city originated in the 18th century as the family manor of Counts Bobrinsky, who industrialized it towards the end of the 19th century. The city, under the name of Bobriki was officially established in 1930 and continued to develop as a coal (lignite) mining center throughout the Soviet period. In 1933, it was renamed Stalinogorsk. During World War II, the city was occupied by the German Army from November 22, 1941 to December 11, 1941. In 1961, it was given its present name. The city was awarded the Order of the Red Banner of Labor on January 14, 1971.

Administrative and municipal status
Within the framework of administrative divisions, Novomoskovsk serves as the administrative center of Novomoskovsky District. As an administrative division, it is, together with three rural localities, incorporated within Novomoskovsky District as Novomoskovsk City Under District Jurisdiction. As a municipal division, the territories of Novomoskovsk Town Under District Jurisdiction and of thirteen rural okrugs of Novomoskovsky District are incorporated as Novomoskovsk Urban Okrug.

Notable people

Twin towns and sister cities

Novomoskovsk is twinned with:
 Kremenchuk, Ukraine
 Kuşadası, Turkey
 Prievidza, Slovakia

References

Sources

Notes

Registry of the Inhabited Localities in Tula Oblast

Cities and towns in Tula Oblast
De-Stalinization